was a Japanese professional shogi player who achieved the rank of 8-dan (the highest rank at the time), and was the first president of the Japan Shogi Association.

Shogi professional

Born in Matsuyama, Doi eventually moved to the Yūrakuchō district in Tokyo.

With the guidance of teacher Kinjirō Sekine, Ichitarō Doi reached the rank of 4-dan in 1910.

In 1917, Doi reached 8-dan. He along with Kinjirō Sekine, Sankichi Sakata (a potential Meijin candidate), and Kaiō Takeuchi (竹内翁) was one of the few players with an 8-dan rank at the time that Sekine became the thirteenth Meijin. Doi's record against Sakata was 1 win and 1 loss.

As a strong player, when the Mejin system shifted to a tournament competition, Doi was one of the 8 competitors in the very first tournament league in 1937, all of which were defeated by Yoshio Kimura, the first Real Strength Meijin. And, after defeating all 13 others in the second league, Doi at 54 years old was first challenger for the second year of the Meijin title in 1940 although Kimura was again victorious and retained the title.

Doi retired from professional life in 1949 at 62 years old.

In 1954, Doi was the second to receive the title  at 67 years old.

Tokyo Shogi Federation president 

In 1921, Doi lead his own group of players known as the 東京将棊同盟社 while the other two sects in Tokyo were led by Sekine (the 東京将棊倶楽部) and Kumao Ōsaki (the 東京将棊研究會). This is the beginning of the current Japan Shogi Association. Later, Doi stepped down as president in 1934.

References

Japanese shogi players
Deceased professional shogi players
Recipients of the Order of the Sacred Treasure, 4th class
Professional shogi players from Ehime Prefecture
People from Matsuyama, Ehime
1887 births
1973 deaths